The Plaza Theater in Burlington, Kansas, at 404 Neosho St., was built in 1942.  It was listed on the National Register of Historic Places in 2005.

It replaced a 1941-built Plaza Theater which was destroyed in a flood. It was designed by architect Al Hauetter in Moderne style.

In 1990 the facility began to be operated as the Flint Hills Opry, a live performance space.  It was later operated as The Music Box Theatre, also a live performance space.

References

External links

Theatres in Kansas
National Register of Historic Places in Coffey County, Kansas
Buildings and structures completed in 1942